The 2000 Men's Olympic Water Polo Qualifying Tournament was held at the Stadionbad indoor-pool in Hanover, Germany, from May 6 to May 14, 2000. The competition decided the remaining five competing teams at the 2000 Summer Olympics in Sydney, Australia. Fifteen teams entered the competition. Africa did not send a team.

Teams

GROUP A

GROUP B

GROUP C

GROUP D

Preliminary round

GROUP A

May 6, 2000

May 7, 2000

May 8, 2000

GROUP B

May 6, 2000

May 7, 2000

May 8, 2000

GROUP C

May 6, 2000

May 7, 2000

May 8, 2000

GROUP D

May 6, 2000

May 7, 2000

May 8, 2000

Second round

GROUP E

May 10, 2000

May 11, 2000

May 12, 2000

GROUP F

May 10, 2000

May 11, 2000

May 12, 2000

GROUP G

May 10, 2000

May 11, 2000

May 12, 2000

Play-Offs
May 13, 2000 — 9th/12th place

May 13, 2000 — 5th/8th place

May 13, 2000 — 1st/4th place

Finals
May 14, 2000 — Eleventh place

May 14, 2000 — Ninth place

May 14, 2000 — Seventh place

May 14, 2000 — Fifth place

May 14, 2000 — Third place

May 14, 2000 — First place

Final ranking

Yugoslavia, Russia, Greece, Slovakia and the Netherlands qualified for the 2000 Summer Olympics in Sydney, Australia

Individual awards
Most Valuable Player

Best Goalkeeper

Best Scorer

See also
 2000 Women's Water Polo Olympic Qualifier

References
  FINA

Qual
W
2000